Oksana Selekhmeteva and Daniela Vismane were the defending champions but chose not to participate.

Anna Danilina and Valeriya Strakhova won the title, defeating María Carlé and Maria Timofeeva in the final, 2–6, 6–3, [14–12].

Seeds

Draw

Draw

References

External links
Main Draw

Engie Open de Biarritz - Doubles